Slagelse Stadium (Danish: Slagelse Stadion; currently known as Harboe Arena Slagelse for sponsorship reasons) is a sports center located in Slagelse, Denmark, which, among other things, is used for athletics and the running of football matches on the associated stadium, including home games for Slagelse B&I. Formerly, its elite project FC Vestsjælland also used the stadium as its home ground.

The sports complex was built in 1927 by Slagelse Municipality, among others, as a result of the complete merging of Slagelse Boldklub and Slagelse Idræts-Forening to Slagelse B&I i 1919. The stadium has a capacity of 10,000, of which 3,300 are seating. The stadium record of 10,000 spectators dates back to the early 1970s, when it hosted with a division match in Danish top tier between Slagelse B&I and Holbæk B&I.

Rebuilding 
In 2012, the stadium was rebuilt to include heating in the field, new lighting, new stands, among other improvements.

Notes 

Football venues in Denmark
FC Vestsjælland
Slagelse